The Journal of Pure and Applied Algebra is a monthly peer-reviewed scientific journal covering that part of algebra likely to be of general mathematical interest: algebraic results with immediate applications, and the development of algebraic theories of sufficiently general relevance to allow for future applications. 

Its founding editors-in-chief were Peter J. Freyd (University of Pennsylvania) and Alex Heller (City University of New York). The current managing editors are Eric Friedlander (University of Southern California), Charles Weibel (Rutgers University), and Srikanth Iyengar (University of Utah).

Abstracting and indexing 
The journal is abstracted and indexed in Current Contents/Physics, Chemical, & Earth Sciences, Mathematical Reviews, PASCAL, Science Citation Index, Zentralblatt MATH, and Scopus. According to the Journal Citation Reports, the journal has a 2016 impact factor of 0.652.

References

External links 
 

Mathematics journals
Monthly journals
English-language journals
Elsevier academic journals
Publications established in 1971